Major-General Sir Guy Campbell, 1st Baronet, CB (22 January 1786 – 26 January 1849), was a British Army officer, the eldest son of Lieutenant-General Colin Campbell and his wife Mary, daughter of Guy Johnson (or Johnstone). His branch of the Campbell baronets is referred to as St Cross Mede.

Biography
Campbell entered the army as an ensign in the 6th Regiment of Foot in 1795, of which his father was then lieutenant-colonel, and was promoted lieutenant on 4 April 1796. He served in all the regiment's engagements under his father's command during the Irish Rebellion of 1798. Campbell, with the rest of the regiment, went to Canada in 1803, and he was promoted captain on 14 September 1804. (By this time, his father had been promoted to major-general and held a command in Ireland.)

Campbell again saw action with the 6th during the Peninsular War, fighting at Roliça and Vimeiro, and taking part in the advance and retreat of Sir John Moore. Promoted major on 1 April 1813, Campbell and the 6th fought at Vitoria (21 June 1813), and owing to the wounding of the colonel, took command of the regiment. During the subsequent campaigns, Campbell led the 6th during the Battle of the Pyrenees, and was badly wounded while leading the regiment, on 2 August 1813, to the storming of the Heights of Echalar, a feat which won the commendation of Wellington for the regiment. Campbell was breveted lieutenant-colonel on 26 August 1813 as a result.

After the war, he received a gold medal for his conduct at the Battle of the Pyrenees and was awarded the CB. He was created a baronet on 22 May 1815 in recognition of the services of his father, the remainder being to his father's heirs-male. He rejoined the 6th in 1815, and served as a staff officer at the Battle of Waterloo, going on half-pay in 1816.

Sir Guy married Frances Elizabeth Burgoyne on 17 January 1817, by whom he had one daughter before her death on 8 May 1818. He remarried on 21 November 1820 to Pamela FitzGerald (1795/1796 – 25 November 1869), the eldest daughter of Lord Edward FitzGerald and Pamela Syms. By her he had four sons, of whom one died in infancy, and six daughters. Campbell was appointed deputy quartermaster-general in Ireland in 1830, and was promoted major-general in 1841, receiving command of the Athlone district.

On 24 October 1848, he was appointed colonel of the 3rd West India Regiment. He died in 1849 at Dún Laoghaire after a long illness and is buried at Collins Barracks, then known as the Royal Barracks, in Dublin.

Sir Guy's descendant, Sir Guy Campbell, 5th Baronet, was baronet from 1960 until his death in 1993, and the current baronet, Lachlan Campbell, is his son.

References
 

1786 births
1849 deaths
Baronets in the Baronetage of the United Kingdom
British Army major generals
British Army personnel of the Napoleonic Wars
Companions of the Order of the Bath
People of the Irish Rebellion of 1798
Recipients of the Army Gold Medal
Royal Warwickshire Fusiliers officers